De bene esse is a Latin legal term meaning of well being. It can refer to various acts which are conditional, provisional or anticipatory.

United Kingdom

De bene esse has been used in English law for hundreds of years. For example, in Equity Cases Abridged (1744), it was used to describe the deposition of a witness before trial in the Court of Chancery:

In R v Mirza (2004), Lord Hobhouse of Woodborough used the term to refer to evidence which a court receives provisionally for the purpose of assessing its admissibility:

United States

In the context of American law, a proceeding de bene esse is one "which [is] taken ex parte or provisionally and [is] allowed to stand as well done for the present." A deposition that is used or intended to be used in place of a witness' live testimony in court is referred to as a de bene esse deposition.

In past times, an appearance de bene esse was a special appearance made solely to contest jurisdiction. The procedure has long been abolished in most if not all jurisdictions in favor of allowing jurisdictional objections to be made either by motion or set out as an affirmative defense in a responsive pleading (an answer to the complaint): in the Federal courts, the procedure was superannuated by the adoption of the Federal Rules of Civil Procedure, and, in Pennsylvania, by a 1965 amendment to the state rules of civil procedure. The procedure has been referred to by sovereign citizens.

References

Latin legal terminology